The 2020 Armagh Senior Football Championship is the 120th edition of Armagh GAA's premier gaelic football tournament for senior clubs in County Armagh, Northern Ireland. The winners will not represent Armagh in the Ulster Senior Club Football Championship as the Club Championships were cancelled for 2020 due to the COVID-19 pandemic.

The original championship format was for all sixteen teams to compete in four groups of four teams before proceeding to a knock-out format with the overall winners receiving the Gerry Fegan Cup. Due to the emergence of the COVID-19 pandemic however, clubs were asked by the Armagh County Board to back the proposal to run a straight-knockout championship, which was passed.

Crossmaglen Rangers were the defending champions after they defeated Ballymacnab Round Towers in the 2019 final.

This was Grange St. Colmcille's and Mullaghbawn Cuchulainns' return to the senior grade after they claimed the 2019 I.F.C./I.A.F.L. titles and second in I.A.F.L. respectively.

Maghery Seán MacDermott's won their second Armagh Senior Football Championship by defeating Crossmaglen Rangers 4–9 to 0–17 in the final.

Team Changes

The following teams have changed division since the 2019 championship season.

Promoted To S.F.C. from I.F.C.

 Grange St. Colmcille's  -  (I.F.C. Champions)
 Mullaghbawn Cuchulainns - (I.A.F.L. Champions)

Relegated to I.F.C. from S.F.C.

 Sarsfields - (7th S.B.F.L.)
 Cullaville Blues - (8th S.B.F.L.)

Round 1

Quarter-finals
 Pearse Óg win 5 - 3 on penalties.

Semi-finals

Final

References

External links

Armagh Senior Football Championship
Armagh Senior Football Championship
Armagh SFC